The 2010–11 North American winter was influenced by an ongoing La Niña, seeing winter storms and very cold temperatures affect a large portion of the Continental United States, even as far south as the Texas Panhandle. By far the most notable event was a historic blizzard that impacted areas from Oklahoma to Michigan in early February. The blizzard broke numerous snowfall records, and was one of the few winter storms to rank as a Category 5 on the Regional Snowfall Index. In addition, Oklahoma set a statewide low temperature record in February.

While there is no well-agreed-upon date used to indicate the start of winter in the Northern Hemisphere, there are two definitions of winter which may be used. Based on the astronomical definition, winter begins at the winter solstice, which in 2010 occurred late on December 21 (early on December 22 in EST), and ends at the March equinox, which in 2011 occurred on March 20. Based on the meteorological definition, the first day of winter is December 1 and the last day February 28. Both definitions involve a period of approximately three months, with some variability.

Seasonal forecasts 

On October 21, 2010, the National Oceanic and Atmospheric Administration's Climate Prediction Center issued its US winter outlook. It predicted a La Niña to form. The Outlook predicted colder and wetter than average winter for the Pacific Northwest and Northern plains. It also predicted that the Southern plains, Gulf States, Southwest and Southeast Regions receiving a warmer and drier winter season with Florida having equal chance of a below or above average temperatures. The central United States, Mid Atlantic and New England had equal chances of having below or above average temperature and precipitation.
It predicted that Alaska would have colder than average temperatures with an equal chance for above average or below average precipitation. It predicted that Hawaii would be drier than average in November but Wetter December through February.

Events 
The 2010–2011 winter featured several significant storms, and one of them was a historic storm. A storm that spawned a devastating tornado outbreak in mid-April was responsible for a late-season blizzard in the Great Plains.

Late October bomb cyclone 

In late October, a massive cyclone brought a serial derecho to a large portion of the United States, as well an early season blizzard to parts of the Midwest and Canadian Prairies from October 25 through October 28. Forming over the Upper Midwest, it intensified rapidly prompting the storm to be classified as a bomb cyclone which are more common over the ocean rather than over land. The massive storm across the entire country and up into Canada bringing a wide variety of weather. It was responsible for 69 tornadoes across the country with an EF2 being the highest category.

Late December blizzard  

This was a long-lived storm that primarily effected the Pacific Northwest and eastern regions of the US and Canada. The storm developed along the so-called Pineapple Express Atmospheric river as a disturbance in the Gulf of Alaska on December 5 and intensified as it began to move toward land. By the 8th it reached the coast of northwest North America but significantly weakened and a new storm formed in the Gulf of Alaska. By December 15 the storm had moved back toward the west coast and interacted with a kona low situated over Hawaii which feed the storm more energy through the Pineapple Express. The storm had undergone Explosive cyclogenesis  on December 19, which caused flooding and mudslides in California. It would start to weaken as it move towards the Gulf of Mexico. It would dump snow on the mountains of Southern California and the 4 Corners region of the Country. When the storm reached Texas it absorbed Gulf Stream moisture and reintensified as it moved toward the Florida Panhandle on December 24. It transferred into a nor'easter as it moved up the east coast on December 27. It dumped snow on a portion of the Mid Atlantic and New England and was officially classified as a blizzard in New York City. Philadelphia received  of snow and nearby Trenton, New Jersey saw upwards of  snowfall totals. Boston and coastal areas of Virginia saw only  of snow. Wind gusts reached  in certain areas, creating horrible driving conditions. The highest winds were recorded in Nova Scotia of 94.4 MPH (151.9 kp/h).

New Year's Eve tornado outbreak 

A tornado outbreak struck the southern United States in late December. The Storm Prediction Center has been calling for a significant severe weather event since December 25. However the predictability of the event was uncertain but, forecasts gained confidence as the event drew closer. On December 30 only marginally conductive conditions were present for a severe weather to form. Later on an approaching cold front induced supercells to form in the evening hours. The storm had spawned up to 5 EF3 tornadoes. On December 30, a few tornadoes were reported in portions of Arkansas. On the morning of December 31 there were several reports of tornadoes in Illinois and Missouri. In the afternoon and into the next day in Mississippi, a tornado in Jackson, Mississippi, prompted a tornado emergency to be issued.

Early January blizzard 

In the middle of January, a storm formed in the Gulf of Mexico and interacted with cold air mass in Canada. This storm would eventually merge with an Alberta clipper over Cape Hatteras. It would track up the east coast as a nor'easter before moving out to sea. It would bring winter weathering the form of snow and freezing rain from Texas to Atlantic Canada. It brought snowfall to areas that got hit hard by the previous blizzard. In New England there were reports of 2 feet of snow.

Late January blizzard 

In late January, another major snowstorm hit the Northeast. It brought a winter storm to the mid Atlantic and a blizzard to New England. It hit two weeks after the previous nor'easter and one month after the December nor'easter, striking one week before the historic blizzard. The first part of this system hit the northeast as a coastal low with snow lasting from early January 26 to mid day of January 27. The second round of snow came when an upper-level low moved from eastern Tennessee  to southern New England. This round had much steeper lapse rates than the first round and there were reports of thundersnow in some of the heavier bands. Areas with rain had gradually changed over to freezing rain then sleet.

Groundhog Day blizzard 

On January 31, a low-pressure system formed in Montana, and merged with a storm that pushed in from Northern California and a third storm in the Gulf of Mexico over the Midwest, on February 1, and rapidly intensified. The resulting storm brought a historic blizzard to the Midwest. It was the first storm to rank as a Category 5 on the RSI since 2009. It brought a tornado outbreak to the southeast states with most reported in Alabama. It brought a blizzard and winter storm from New Mexico to New England and later up into Atlantic Canada. Chicago received 1 to 2 feet of snow and 60 mph winds. The greater area of northern Illinois getting anywhere from 20 to 28 inches of snow. It hit the Midwest and New England with an ice storm along the warm front and mixed precipitation from New Mexico to Northern Texas. This ice storm brought  of ice to several areas.

Mid-April storm complex 

On April 14, a storm developed across the Midwest, bringing a tornado outbreak to much of the United States, and became the largest April tornado outbreak until the 2011 Super Outbreak, later in the month. In the southern part of the country, this tornado outbreak spawned 178 tornadoes, with the strongest category being an EF3. It was reported that the storm also produced large hail and straight-line winds. The system brought a late season snowstorm to the Midwest and Northern Plains, and blizzard conditions to parts of South Dakota and northern Nebraska. With surface temperatures near freezing the snow was unusually wet for the region. This lead for bad driving conditions on Interstate 80 and Interstate 90.

See also

 Global storm activity of 2010

References

External links 
2010 Storm Summaries from the Weather Prediction Center
2011 Storm Summaries from the Weather Prediction Center

2010 in Canada
2011 in Canada
2010 in the United States
2011 in the United States
2010 meteorology
2011 meteorology
North American winters